TN1 or TN-1 may refer to:
 Tainan TN-1, a single seat glider
 Tennessee's 1st congressional district
 Tennessee State Route 1
 TN status, a special immigration status in the United States
 TN1, a postcode district in Tunbridge Wells, England; see TN postcode area